Alan Aguerre (born 23 August 1990) is an Argentine footballer who plays as a goalkeeper for Talleres in the Argentine Primera División.

Career
Aguerre started his professional career playing for Vélez Sarsfield in a 4–1 victory over Atlético de Rafaela, for the 2013 Inicial, replacing injured Sebastián Sosa in the starting lineup. Despite the strength of Vélez' youths in every other position of the field, Aguerre was the first goalkeeper of the club's youth divisions to debut for the first team since Bernardo Leyenda in 1999. The goalkeeper was an unused substitute for Sosa in Vélez' 2012 Inicial, 2012–13 Superfinal and 2013 Supercopa Argentina winning campaigns.

In the 2015 Argentine Primera División, Aguerre replaced Sosa as the starting goalkeeper of the team. He saved his first penalty kick in a 2–2 draw with Godoy Cruz for the 9th fixture. Aguerre's first clean sheet was in a 2–0 victory over Boca Juniors, in which, according to the local sports media, he had an outstanding performance.

With Fabián Cubero and Leandro Somoza injured, Aguerre also captained Vélez's young squad during the second half of the tournament. At the end of the year, the goalkeeper was selected as Vélez Sarsfield's best player of the year in a poll held at the club's official website. After the end of the 2016 Argentine Primera División, the goalkeeper was linked with Argentine powerhouse River Plate to replace Marcelo Barovero, although he ended up staying in Vélez.

In August 2016, Aguerre surpassed José Luis Chilavert' record for consecutive minutes with a clean sheet playing for Vélez, with a total 669' (held along Gonzalo Yordan, who played 20 minutes in the 0–0 draw with Banfield).

Honours
Vélez Sarsfield
 Argentine Primera División: 2012 Inicial, 2012–13 Superfinal
 Supercopa Argentina: 2013

References

External links
Profile at Vélez Sarsfield's official website 

Living people
1990 births
Footballers from Buenos Aires
Argentine footballers
Argentine Primera División players
Club Atlético Vélez Sarsfield footballers
Newell's Old Boys footballers
Talleres de Córdoba footballers
Association football goalkeepers